Minas de Corrales is a town in the Rivera Department of northeastern Uruguay.

Geography

History
In 1878 the mining company Compañía Francesa de Minas de Oro del Uruguay started looking for gold in the area, giving thus birth to the town.
From the end of December 1879 to the start of March 1880 Henry Küss visited Uruguay to evaluate the gold concession on the Arroyo Corrales.
The company was looking for at least 8 million francs to develop the mines. 
Küss undertook a careful survey of the mineralogy.
His report was unenthusiastic, saying only that it might be worth spending two or three hundred thousand francs on a more systematic study.
In 1902 the railway line was inaugurated, which operated until 1916, when the company ended. On 9 November 1920, it was declared a "Pueblo" (village) by the Act of Ley Nº 7.299, and on 13 December 1994, its status was elevated to "Villa" (town) by the Act of Ley Nº 16.669.

In 1997 the mining operations resumed by the company Uruguay Mineral Exploration (UME).

Population
In 2011 Minas de Corrales had a population of 3,788.
 
Source: Instituto Nacional de Estadística de Uruguay

Places of worship
 St. John Bosco Parish Church (Roman Catholic)

Nearby attractions
About  towards the west of the town is the scenic area Rincón de Tres Cerros. Although the whole area is best visible from along the banks of Tacuarembó River, the hills can be approached by a road splitting south from Route 29,  after Minas de Corrales.

References

External links

INE map of Minas de Corrales
Intendencia Departamental de Rivera / Minas de Corrales
Map showing the mining sites near Minas de Corrales

Populated places in the Rivera Department
Geology of Uruguay